August Wilhelm of Prussia  may refer to:

Prince August Wilhelm of Prussia (1887–1949)
August Wilhelm, Prince of Prussia (1722–1758)